The Copa Amazonas was the association football state cup of Amazonas, organized by the Federação Amazonense de Futebol (FAF), in order to decide one of the representatives of the state at the Copa Verde.

List of champions

References

Football in Amazonas (Brazilian state)